U. bergmanniana var. bergmanniana is endemic to mountain slopes at elevations of 1500–2600 m in the Chinese provinces of Anhui, Gansu, Henan, Hubei, Hunan, Jiangxi, Shaanxi, Shanxi, Sichuan, Yunnan, and Zhejiang.

Description
The tree is distinguished by Fu (2002) as having "Leaf blade adaxially densely hirsute when young; (later) glabrescent with tufted hairs only remaining in axil of veins. Flowers and fruits February–April".

Pests and diseases
No information available.

Cultivation
This variety is extremely rare in cultivation in Europe and North America. There are no known cultivars of this taxon, nor is it known to be in commerce.

Accessions

Europe
Grange Farm Arboretum, Sutton St James, Spalding, Lincolnshire, UK. Acc. no. not known.

References

Elm species and varieties
Trees of China
Flora of China
Trees of Asia
Flora of Zhejiang
Ulmus articles missing images
bergmanniana var. bergmanniana